The Bridesmaid is a novel by British writer Ruth Rendell, published in 1989. It is generally considered a fan-favourite, and was adapted into an acclaimed 2004 film by Claude Chabrol (who had previous adapted Rendell's earlier novel A Judgement in Stone, with great success).

References

1989 British novels
British novels adapted into films
Novels by Ruth Rendell
Hutchinson (publisher) books
Mysterious Press books
Doubleday Canada books